Kito Poblah (born September 18, 1987) is a retired Canadian football wide receiver. He played professionally for the Winnipeg Blue Bombers and BC Lions of the Canadian Football League.  He played college football with the Central Michigan Chippewas.

Professional career

Winnipeg Blue Bombers 
Poblah didn't qualify for non-import status until after the 2011 CFL Draft, and, as such, was only eligible to be taken in the 2011 supplemental draft. He was drafted by the Winnipeg Blue Bombers with the team forfeiting a first-round 2012 CFL Draft pick to do so and signed a contract with the team on June 4, 2011.
Poblah spent three seasons as a member of the Blue Bombers. In three seasons in Winnipeg he totaled 53 receptions for 534 yards with one touchdown. His best season was the 2012 CFL season in which he had 41 receptions for 417 yards and his lone touchdown. Poblah's missed significant playing time due to injuries in both the 2011 and 2013 CFL season's.

BC Lions 
On January 31, 2014, Poblah was traded to the BC Lions in exchange for import defensive back Korey Banks. He played for one season for the Lions, registering 15 catches for 182 yards and one touchdown. He was released on May 25, 2015.

References

External links
BC Lions profile

1987 births
BC Lions players
Canadian football wide receivers
Central Michigan Chippewas football players
Living people
Players of Canadian football from Quebec
Canadian football people from Montreal
Winnipeg Blue Bombers players